The 8th World Science Fiction Convention (Worldcon), also known as NorWesCon, was held on 1–4 September 1950 at the Multnomah Hotel in Portland, Oregon, United States. The supporting organization was the Portland Science-Fantasy Society.

The chairman was Donald B. Day.

Participants 

Attendance was approximately 400.

Guests of Honor 

 Anthony Boucher
 Theodore Sturgeon (toastmaster, listed as the "Entertainment Master of Ceremonies")

Programming and events 

An advance preview screening of George Pal's science fiction film Destination Moon was held at a nearby local theater for NorWesCon members.

See also 

 Hugo Award
 Science fiction
 Speculative fiction
 World Science Fiction Society
 Worldcon

References

External links 

 nesfa.org 1950 convention notes 

1950 conferences
1950 in Portland, Oregon
Events in Portland, Oregon
Science fiction conventions in the United States
September 1950 events in the United States
Worldcon